Siagonium americanum is a species of flat rove beetle in the family Staphylinidae. It is found in North America.

References

Further reading

 

Piestinae
Articles created by Qbugbot
Beetles described in 1844